"Just to See You Smile" is a song written by Mark Nesler and Tony Martin, and recorded by American country music artist Tim McGraw. It was released in August 1997 as the third single from McGraw's fourth studio album Everywhere. Having spent 42 weeks on the Billboard chart, it set what was then a record for being the longest-running single on the Billboard country chart since the inception of Nielsen SoundScan in 1990. It was also the longest chart run for any country single in the 1990s. The song was also released by Mitchell Tenpenny in 2018. No music video was made for this song.

Critical reception
Kevin John Coyne of Country Universe gave the song an A grade, saying McGraw "plays his cards so close to his chest that upon first listen, you may only pick up on his unconditional love and selflessness toward the girl who’s been stringing him along for all these years."

Track listing
Single
 Just To See You Smile 	3:34 	
 Everywhere 	4:50

Chart performance
"Just to See You Smile" debuted in August 1997 and surged in November. It became McGraw's third consecutive No. 1 single from Everywhere, spending six weeks atop the Billboard magazine Hot Country Singles & Tracks chart in January and February 1998. It was also McGraw's second single to be declared by Billboard as the Number One country single of the year.

Chart history

Year-end charts

Certifications

References

1997 singles
Tim McGraw songs
Songs written by Mark Nesler
Songs written by Tony Martin (songwriter)
Billboard Hot Country Songs number-one singles of the year
Song recordings produced by Byron Gallimore
Song recordings produced by James Stroud
Curb Records singles
1997 songs